Ramon John (Ray) La Varis (also known as Del La Varis; 19 February 1932 – 14 December 1986) was an importer in Auckland, New Zealand, and a politician of the National Party.

Early years
La Varis was born in Auckland in 1932. He received his education at King's School and King's College. In 1975, he married Christine Brewer (later known as Christine McElwee) who would serve five terms on the Taupō District Council from 1995 to 2010.

Political career

In 1971 La Varis stood unsuccessfully for the Auckland City Council.

Notes

References

1932 births
1986 deaths
New Zealand National Party MPs
Unsuccessful candidates in the 1972 New Zealand general election
Members of the New Zealand House of Representatives
New Zealand MPs for North Island electorates
People from Auckland
People educated at King's College, Auckland